Ageratina gracilis is a plant in the family Asteraceae, native to South America.

Range
Ageratina gracilis is native to Colombia, Ecuador, and Venezuela, where it grows in mountains at elevations from 1700 to 4100 meters.

Ecology
Ageratina gracilis disperses its seeds by wind and is short-term persistent in the soil seed bank.

Uses
Ageratina gracilis has been investigated for possible anti-cancer properties.

References

gracilis